Digboi Mahila Mahavidyalaya, established in 1981, is a women's general degree college situated at Digboi, in Tinsukia district, Assam. This college is affiliated with the Dibrugarh University. This college offers bachelor's degree courses in arts.

References

External links
http://www.digboimahilamahavidyalaya.com/

Women's universities and colleges in Assam
Colleges affiliated to Dibrugarh University
Educational institutions established in 1981
1981 establishments in Assam